Diamonds – The Best of Dio is a greatest hits collection from heavy metal band Dio. It was released internationally in 1992, but it was never released domestically in the US.

Track listing 
"Holy Diver" (Dio) – 5:54
"Rainbow in the Dark" (Dio, Appice, Bain, Campbell) – 4:16
"Don't Talk to Strangers" (Dio) – 4:53
"We Rock" (Dio) – 4:35
"The Last in Line" (Dio, Bain, Campbell) – 5:47
"Evil Eyes" (Dio) – 3:38 (not included on the LP version)
"Rock 'n' Roll Children" (Dio) – 4:32
"Sacred Heart" (Dio, Appice, Bain, Campbell) – 6:28
"Hungry for Heaven" (Dio, Bain) – 4:11
"Hide in the Rainbow" (Dio, Bain) – 4:06
"Dream Evil" (Dio, Goldie) – 4:29
"Wild One" (Dio, Robertson) – 4:03
"Lock Up the Wolves" (Dio, Robertson, Bain) – 8:34

"Evil Eyes" is the version re-recorded for The Last in Line LP, rather than the original recording, which was the B-side to the "Holy Diver" single.

"Hide In The Rainbow", from The Dio E.P. (EP), had not been released on an album before.

The 1992 Vertigo label (UK) has track 8 listed as "Sacred Children" instead of "Sacred Heart" on the back cover of some releases (bar code 7 31451 22062 3). However, the correct title remains on the disk and in the album booklet.

Personnel 
Ronnie James Dio - vocals, keyboards, producer
Vivian Campbell - guitars (1-9)
Craig Goldy - guitars (10,11)
Rowan Robertson - guitars (12,13)
Jimmy Bain - bass (1-11)
Teddy Cook - bass (12,13)
Vinny Appice - drums (1-11)
Simon Wright - drums (12,13)
Claude Schnell - keyboards (4-11)
Jens Johansson - keyboards (12,13)

References

Albums produced by Tony Platt
Dio (band) albums
1992 greatest hits albums
Vertigo Records compilation albums